John Loxton (born 26 November 1945) is an Australian cricketer. He played in twenty-two first-class matches for Queensland between 1966 and 1971.

See also
 List of Queensland first-class cricketers

References

External links
 

1945 births
Living people
Australian cricketers
Queensland cricketers
Cricketers from Brisbane